Joseph R. Shawhan (born January 28, 1963) is an American ice hockey head coach who is currently leading the program at Michigan Tech.

Career
Shawhan began his time at Lake Superior State in 1982. After sitting out the 1984–85 season he returned in force, finishing second in the nation with a 3.03 goals against average. During his time with the Lakers the program went from 11th in the conference to a perennial power and won the national title the year after he finished school. Shawhan stuck around his hometown of Sault Ste. Marie, Michigan for several more years, working as a volunteer assistant for the Lakers until he accepted the head coaching job for the expansion Soo Indians (also located in Sault Ste. Marie). The Indians lasted only ten seasons with Shawhan serving as the general manager and head coach for the entire time, but during their brief existence they left a lasting impression. Shawhan compiled a record of 474–162–43, becoming the winningest coach in the history of the NAHL. He won the coach of the year three times (1996, 2000 and 2001) while his team won three league titles.

After the Soo Indians suspended operations in 2005 Shawhan returned to college, rejoining Lake Superior State as a full-time assistant staying with the Lakers for another three years before accepting his first position outside of Sault Ste. Marie. He still didn't have to the leave the Upper Peninsula, moving down the road a short way to Marquette and becoming first a volunteer assistant for Northern Michigan and transitioned into director of hockey operations before assuming a full-time assistant coaching position. In 2014 he accepted a post at Michigan Tech as an assistant under Mel Pearson. Shawhan worked specifically with the goaltenders and defenseman and the team saw immediate results, recording three consecutive 20+ win seasons (their first since 1988) and made the NCAA tournament for the first time since 1981.

With Shawhan's arrival timing perfectly for the program's renaissance he was perhaps the obvious choice to be named as Pearson's replacement in 2017.

Head coaching record

References

External links

1963 births
Living people
American men's ice hockey goaltenders
Lake Superior State Lakers men's ice hockey players
Michigan Tech Huskies men's ice hockey coaches
People from Sault Ste. Marie, Michigan
Ice hockey coaches from Michigan
Ice hockey players from Michigan